Fyodor Grigoryevich Reshetnikov (25 November 1919  –  19 June 2011) was a Russian physicist, chemist, and metallurgist.  Reshetnikov became a corresponding member of the USSR Academy of Sciences in 1974, academician (full member) of the Russian Academy of Sciences in 1992 and was a three-time recipient of the USSR State Prize (1951, 1975, 1985).

Born in the village of Mar-Buda in Sumy Oblast, Ukrainian SSR, Soviet Union (now in Ukraine), Reshetnikov graduated in 1942 from the Moscow Institute of Non-Ferrous Metals and Gold (now part of the State University of Non-Ferrous Metals and Gold in Krasnoyarsk). He served in the Red Army during World War II (1942–45).

References

Further reading

External links
 
 

1919 births
2011 deaths
Corresponding Members of the USSR Academy of Sciences
Full Members of the Russian Academy of Sciences
People from Sumy Oblast
Russian chemists
Russian physicists
Soviet military personnel of World War II
Recipients of the USSR State Prize
Burials in Troyekurovskoye Cemetery